Gianni Minervini may refer to:

 Gianni Minervini (swimmer)
 Gianni Minervini (producer)